Symbiosis, is a public artwork by American artist Richard Hunt, located at the Carnegie Hall on the Howard University campus in Washington, D.C., United States. Symbiosis was originally surveyed as part of the Smithsonian's Save Outdoor Sculpture! survey in 1993.

Description
This corten steel abstract sculpture is described as "resembling a head, either human or animal, with appendages." It has no base—the entire piece rests on the ground.

This sculpture, sometimes called Bison, was a gift to Howard University by Hobart Taylor, Jr., a former member of the Board of Trustees. Taylor died in 1981 and the sculpture was dedicated to the university on December 2, 1981.

An appraisal made by Art Resource Technical Service in 2004 valued the sculpture at $50,000 ($ in  dollars). The sculpture was surveyed in 1993 for its condition and it was described as "well maintained".

References

Outdoor sculptures in Washington, D.C.
Howard University
Artworks in the collection of Howard University
Sculptures by Richard Hunt (sculptor)
Steel sculptures in Washington, D.C.
1981 sculptures